Urban dust domes are a meteorological phenomenon in which soot, dust, and chemical emissions become trapped in the air above urban spaces. This trapping is a product of local air circulations. Calm surface winds are drawn to urban centers, they then rise above the city and descend slowly on the periphery of the developed core. This cycle is often a cause of smog through photochemical reactions that occur when strong concentrations of the pollutants in this cycle are exposed to solar radiation. These are one result of urban heat islands: pollutants concentrate in a dust dome because convection lifts pollutants into the air, where they remain because of somewhat stable air masses produced by the urban heat island.

The urban heat island which causes a city to heat up, caps the dust and other particulates at a low level in the atmosphere. If there is not a strong enough wind, then this dome that is created remains intact and causes that heated up air within the urban heat island. Though if the wind does blow strong enough, then this dome is blown downwind causing it to move out of the city.

References 

Air pollution